William Gleason may refer to:

Baseball
Bill Gleason (1858–1932), baseball player for the St. Louis Browns
Bill Gleason (pitcher) (1868–1893), baseball player for the Cleveland Infants
Kid Gleason (1866–1933), William "Kid" Gleason, Major League Baseball player and manager of the 1919 Chicago White Sox during the Black Sox Scandal
Billy Gleason (1894–1957), baseball player, second baseman

Others
William Gleason (aikidoka) (born 1943), American author, 6th degree black belt of Aikido and founder of Shobu Aikido of Boston
William Henry Gleason (1829–1902), American real-estate developer and politician; cofounder of the city of Eau Gallie, Florida
William Henry Gleason (New York politician) (1833–1892), American politician and minister
William Lansing Gleason (fl. 20th century), cofounder of the town of Indian Harbour Beach, Florida, USA
William A. Gleason, American professor of English
William E. Gleason (1830s–after 1880), Justice of the Dakota Territorial Supreme Court

See also
William Gleeson (disambiguation)